Claudia Irene Celedón Ureta (born 15 August 1966) is a Chilean television, film, and theater actress. She is the winner of an Altazor Award for best theater actress for her role in the play Mujer gallina, and was awarded at the Cartagena International Film Festival for her role in Old Cats. She is the mother of the actress , and ex-wife of Cristián García-Huidobro.

Biography
Claudia Celedón is the daughter of the actor and publicist  and Bernadette Ureta.

She also worked on humor programs such as De chincol a jote, Jaguar Yu, and the segment "Los Eguiguren" on Sábados gigantes.

In theater, she acted in Ser un romántico viajero, Ingenuas Palomas, Cariño Malo, Malinche, Sidhartha, El Seductor, and Madame de Sade, among others. In addition, she has acted and participated in the collective creation of Bareatoa and Hermanos Martínez Internacional.

In 2004 she received the Altazor Award for La Mujer Gallina. That same year she worked on the short film La Perra, on the TVN series , and on the play . She also played Gabriela Mistral in the biographical project of the poet called La pasajera.

Filmography

Film

Television

Awards
 2004 Altazor Awards: Best Theater Actress (Mujer gallina)
 2008 Pedro Sienna Award: Best Supporting Actress (La vida me mata)
 2011 Cartagena International Film Festival: Best Actress (Old Cats)
 2012 Pedro Sienna Award: Best Supporting Actress (Old Cats)

Nominations
 2000 Altazor Awards: Best Film Actress (The Sentimental Teaser)
 2005 Altazor Awards: Best Theater Actress (El taller de los celos)
 2008 Altazor Awards: Best Film Actress (La vida me mata)
 2010 Altazor Awards: Best Actress (The Maid)

References

External links
 

1966 births
20th-century Chilean actresses
21st-century Chilean actresses
Actresses from Santiago
Chilean film actresses
Chilean people of Basque descent
Chilean stage actresses
Chilean telenovela actresses
Living people